Alan Douglas Hayes (24 May 1939 – 30 January 2019) was an Australian rules footballer who played for the Richmond Football Club in the Victorian Football League (VFL) and Central District Football Club in the South Australian Football League (SANFL).

Notes

External links 

1939 births
2019 deaths
Australian rules footballers from Victoria (Australia)
Richmond Football Club players
Central District Football Club players